The Kingdom of Dambadeniya was a medieval kingdom in what is present-day Sri Lanka. The kingdom's rulers reigned from 1220–1345.

History

Founding
The first king to choose Dambadeniya as his capital was Vijayabahu III. He was able to bring about the unity among the Sangha that had fled in various directions due to the hostile activities of the invader Kalinga Magha and succeeded in holding a Buddhist convention in 1226 to bring about peace among the Buddhist clergy.

King Parakramabahu II was the king who inherited the throne after King Vijayabahu. He was considered a genius, who was a great poet and a prolific writer. Among the books he wrote are Kausilumina, which is considered a great piece of literature. Unifying the three kingdoms that existed within Sri Lanka at that point in time is regarded as the greatest achievement.

King Bosath Vijayabahu, as the eldest son of King Parakramabahu the second, was crowned in 1270. He was well known for his modest behaviour and for his religious activities. He was killed in the second year of his reign by a minister called Miththa.

After the demise of his elder brother Vijayabahu, Bhuvanekabahu I, as the next in line to the throne, shifted the capital to Yapahuwa for reasons of security. He followed his father's footsteps as a writer and continued with the religious activities started by his brother Vijayabahu IV.

Rule from Yapahuwa
After the assassination of Vijayabahu IV, his brother became king after a series of conflicts with several dissident generals thus became Bhuvanekabahu I. He considered Dambadeniya as insecure so he made Yapahuwa a rock fortress his permanent residence. Yapahuwa served as the capital of Sri Lanka in the latter part of the 13th century (1273–1284). Built on a huge, 90 meter high rock boulder in the style of the Sigiriya rock fortress, Yapahuwa was a palace and military stronghold against foreign invaders.

The palace and fortress were built by King Buvanekabahu I (1272–1284) in the year 1273. Many traces of ancient battle defences can still be seen, while an ornamental stairway, is its biggest showpiece. On top of the rock are the remains of a stupa, a Bodhi tree enclosure, and a rock shelter/cave used by Buddhist monks, indicating that earlier this site was used as a Buddhist monastery, like many boulders and hills in the area. There are several caves at the base of the rock. In one of them, there is a shrine with Buddha images. One cave has a Brahmi script inscription.
At the southern base of the rock, there is a fortification with two moats and ramparts. In this enclosure, there are the remains of a number of buildings including a Buddhist shrine. There is also a Buddhist temple called Yapawwa Rajamaha Vihara built during the Kandyan period.

The Tooth Relic was brought from Dambadeniya and kept in the Tooth Temple built for the purpose at the top of the third staircase. The relics were carried away from the temple to South India by the Pandyas and then recovered in 1288 by Parakkramabahu III (1287–1293), who temporarily placed them in safety at Polonnaruwa.

Yapahuwa was one of the ephemeral capitals of medieval Sri Lanka. The citadel of Yapahuwa lying midway between matara and galle was built around a huge granite rock rising abruptly almost a hundred meters above the surrounding lowlands.

In 1272, King Bhuvenakabahu transferred the capital from Polonnaruwa to Yapahuwa in the face of Dravidian invasions from South India, bringing the Sacred Tooth Relic with him. Following the death of King Bhuvenakabahu in 1284, the Pandyans of South India invaded Sri Lanka once again and succeeded in capturing Sacred Tooth Relic. Following its capture, Yapahuwa was largely abandoned and inhabited by Buddhist monks and religious ascetics.

Rule from Polonnaruwa
Parakramabahu III who was the son of Vijayabahu III and grandson of Parakramabahu II became king in Polonnaruwa. He tried to bring back the tooth relic to the island via establishing diplomatic relationships with the Pandyan Kingdom. He succeeded and housed the tooth relic in the temple of the Tooth in Polonnaruwa. King died after reigning five years in 1303.

Rule from Kurunagala
Bhuvanekabahu II son of Bhuvanekabahu I succeeded his cousin in 1303 and shifted the capital to nearby Kurunagala and ruled for two years until his death in 1305.

Kurunegala was the capital city of Sri Lanka from 1300-1341. It was a kingdom following kingdom of Yapahuwa. Kurunegala, capital of the Kurunegala District and the modern-day province of Wayamba, was used as a royal capital for around half a century with five kings of the Sinhala dynasty reigning as monarchs. The first ruler was King Buvanekabahu II (1293–1302) the son of Buvanekabahu I of Yapahuwa and cousin to King Parakramabahu III of Polonnaruwa. He was followed not long after by the reign of his son King Parakramabahu IV (1302–1326). Parakramabahu not only translated the Buddhist Jataka tales into Sinhala, he also commissioned a number of temples to be built including the Alutnuwara Dewale in the Kegalla District. Not much is known about his successor Bhuvanaikabahu III who ruled for 9 years and the next two following rulers Vijayabâhu V and Bhuvanaikabâhu IV nor the reason why the capital was soon after moved again. But we do know that the brother of Bhuvanaikabâhu IV, King Parâkkamabâhu V began his reign under the new kingdom of Gampola (1344–1408).

Kurunegala was once known as Hasthishailya-pura and in literature as Athugal-pura (Ethagala). It is the "city of the elephant rock" which is a literal translation and is so named because of a large elephant-shaped rock decorating the landscape. Nestled in with other large rocks, folk legend relates how the rocks were all transformed animals. Once, long ago there was a severe drought and the people became alarmed when many animals began consuming the water and threatened the water supply, so a local witch helped out by turning some of them into stone. The other rocks such as monkey rock and tortoise rock, etc., were named after the different animals and today, on top of the elephant rock sits a gigantic 88 ft tall Buddha.

Kurunegala was also one of the districts in which the sacred tooth relic of the Buddha was kept and venerated. In the 13th century the city had a main citadel and today only a few remains are left of the tooth relic temple apart from a few stone steps and part of a doorway. During the time of King Parakramabahu IV (1302–1326), there was a strong religious revival and rituals concerning the relic were re-ordered in a more systematic way as recorded in the Dalada Sirita.

Later on after the capital changed, the tooth relic was removed to the new capital Jayavardanapura Kotte closer to Colombo by king Virabahu but subsequent Portuguese colonial power in 1505 began to cause the deterioration of Buddhist activities and fearing for the safety of the relic, it was secreted away by Buddhist monks to the kingdom of Sitawaka ruled by king Mayadunne. For a time it was moved around and placed in different locations including the cave temple of Ridivihara about 13 miles from Kurunegala and in the Delgamuva Vihara in Ratnapura. It was from Ratnapura that the tooth relic was finally brought to its current resting place at the temple of the tooth, in Senkadagala (Kandy) by King Vimaladharmasuriya I (1592–1603). Though prior to all these events, the tooth relic had also been kept for a time at Polonnaruwa, Yapahuwa and Dambadeniya.

Throughout the district and nearby, other archaeological cities and sites can be found dating from different periods. The earlier capitals include the city of Panduvasnuwara in the northwest where visitors can see the remains of a moated palace along with Buddhist monasteries dating from the 12th century, Dambadeniya to the south-west, dating from the mid-13th century, and the fortress of Yapahuwa in the north (circa 1301). King Buvanekabahu II established Kurunegala as a kingdom at around 1300 A.C. His son succeeded as king Parakramabahu IV.

Rule of king Parakramabahu IV
He is the greatest king of the Kurunegala period. He was known as Panditha Parakramabahu II because of his services towards Buddhism, education and literature. His services and authority have been witnessed even beyond Kurunegala as far as Kandy, Kegalle, Colombo, Ratnapura, Kalutara, Galle and most of the Southern areas. He wrote a book named Dalatha Siriththa. He built the Asgiriya Viharaya in Kandy.

Rule after king Parakramabahu IV
Two kings named Buvanekabahu III and Vijayabahu V (Savulu Vijayabahu) ruled the kingdom.

Culture

Education
Parakramabahu IV the son of Bhuvanekabahu II was a very wise and intelligent king who was also known as Panditha Parakramabahu. He was responsible for writing 'Dalada Sirita'. He renamed Mahanuwara as Senkadagale, the king was also responsible for translating pali books into Sinhala

 1) Sinhala Bodhiwansaya
 2) Sanda Kinduru Daa Kava

Literature
The Dambadeniya period is considered the golden era of Sinhala literature. Important literary works such as  Sinhala Thupavamsa, Dalada Siriththa, Sarajothi malai were written during the period. Several books in Sinhala, Pali & Sanskrit were written at this time. Among them are books of poetry such as Kausilumina, Muwadewdawatha, Sidath sangarawa, Buthsarana, Saddharma Rathnawaliya. The stone inscriptions in this period include keulgama mavilipitiya, Narambadde Ududumbara Lipiya, Rambukana Dewala Lipiya, Aluthnuwara Dewala Lipiya, Galapatha Viharaya Shila Lipiya. Parakramabahu II wrote two books namely Visuddi Marga Sannasa and Kavisilumina.

See also
 Sri Lanka
 History of Sri Lanka
 List of Sri Lankan monarchs

References

 
Former countries in South Asia
Former monarchies of South Asia
Kingdoms of Sri Lanka
1220 establishments in Asia
13th-century establishments in Sri Lanka
1345 disestablishments in Asia
14th-century disestablishments in Sri Lanka
Transitional period of Sri Lanka